Wietz Tobias Botes (born 26 April 1984, in Worcester) in a South African-born rugby union player, who most recently played for the . He normally plays as a scrum-half or fly-half.

Despite being born in South Africa, he played in 22 test matches for Italy between 2012 and 2014.

Career

Youth rugby

Senior career

Boland Cavaliers

Griquas / Cheetahs

After a season playing for their Under-21 side, he graduated to their senior side, making six appearances during the 2006 Vodacom Cup competition, scoring one try, three conversions and a penalty. His first start in the Currie Cup competition came the following week against .

After a further eight appearances in the 2007 Vodacom Cup, Botes firmly established himself as a first-team regular, appearing in eleven of ' matches during the 2007 Currie Cup Premier Division.

In 2008, Botes was also included in the  squad for the 2008 Super 14 season. During this time, he also made five appearances for Griquas in the 2008 Vodacom Cup and later played in nine matches for them during the 2008 Currie Cup Premier Division competition.

Treviso

In 2008, it was announced that Botes would join Italian Super 10 side for the 2008–09 season. He immediately established himself as a first-choice regular and scored 328 points in a hundred appearances for the club between 2008 and 2014. In the six seasons he spent at the club, they won the Super 10 on two occasions – in 2008–09 and 2009–10 – and also won the Italian Cup in 2010.

He was the top scorer for Benetton Treviso during the 2010–11 Celtic League with 127 points, making a total of 48 appearances in the competition during his spell at the club.

Eastern Province Kings

He returned to South Africa by joining the  prior to the 2014 Currie Cup Premier Division season. He made eight appearances for the Kings in the competition, but wasn't named in the training squad for the 2015 season. Instead, he concentrated on farming at his family farm near Worcester. It was initially indicated that he would to this for the first half of 2015 before returning to action for the EP Kings for the 2015 Currie Cup Premier Division, but it was later confirmed that he would not return to Port Elizabeth.

Italy

In January 2012, he was called up to the Italian squad as cover for the 2012 Six Nations Championship.

He was named amongst the replacements for the opening game against  on 4 February 2012 and made his debut, coming on as a replacement just before the hour mark and kicking a penalty shortly after coming on to score his first international points in a 12–30 loss.

He once again appeared in all five of Italy's matches during the 2013 Six Nations Championship, helping them to two victories during the competition.

He made three more appearances for Italy during the 2014 Six Nations Championship for a total of 22 test matches, scoring eight points through one conversion and two penalties.

References

1984 births
Living people
Italian rugby union players
Italy international rugby union players
Boland Cavaliers players
Cheetahs (rugby union) players
Eastern Province Elephants players
Griquas (rugby union) players
Benetton Rugby players
Rugby union scrum-halves
Rugby union fly-halves
Afrikaner people
South African rugby union players
Rugby union players from Worcester, South Africa